Pisut Praesangeam (also Pisuth Praesaeng-Iam) is a Thai actor, film director, film producer and screenwriter. His films include Bangkok Haunted and Thai Thief.
124

Filmography

As director
Bangkok Haunted (2001)
Thai Thief (2006)

As screenwriter
Koo tae song loke (No Surrender, No Matter What) (1994)
Bangkok Haunted (2001)

As producer
Bangkok Haunted (2001)

As actor
999-9999 (2002)

External links

Year of birth missing (living people)
Living people
Pisut Praesangeam
Pisut Praesangeam
Pisut Praesangeam
Pisut Praesangeam
Pisut Praesangeam